The A Stock cars were built for the District Railway by Brush Traction in 1903. They were the prototype electric units tested by the District Railway.

History
Of the total of fourteen cars, four were End Driving Motors, located at the ends of each unit, two were Middle Driving Motors, located in the middle of the unit, and eight were trailers. Later, two of the trailers were rebuilt into Control Trailers.

These units were wooden-bodied and led to the development of the B Stock.

They were initially used between Acton Town and South Harrow, and starting from 1905 were used on the South Acton - Hounslow service, extended to Uxbridge in 1910.

The last car was withdrawn in 1925 and no examples passed to the London Passenger Transport Board.
 
None survived into preservation.

Fleet details

External links
 photo of london underground A stock

Metropolitan District Railway
A
Train-related introductions in 1903